The Karenni National People's Liberation Front (KNPLF) was a communist and Karenni nationalist insurgent group active in Kayah State, Myanmar (Burma). It agreed to become a government-sponsored border guard force on 8 November 2009 although it remains active under the name of KNPLF.

History 
The KNPLF was formed in 1978, when a group of left-wing fighters split from the Karenni Army due to ideological differences. The group maintained close ties with the Communist Party of Burma (CPB), receiving training, supplies, and armed support from the group until the latter's disarmament in 1989.

In 1989, a ceasefire deal was negotiated between the State Law and Order Restoration Council (SLORC) and the KNPLF, which was finalised in 1994. The group had since helped government soldiers combat other armed insurgent groups, most notably the Karenni Army, and on 8 November 2009, the group agreed to transform into a "border guard force".

The KNPLF has been accused of using child soldiers and landmines in the past, with one child soldier named Koo Reh at age 13 saying:

Recent Events 
Four KNPLF / BGF soldiers were murdered alongside at least 45 civilians during the Mo So massacre committed by the Burmese military on the Christmas Eve of 2021. KNPLF / BGF personnel tried to negotiate with soldiers from the Burmese army to stop them from burning civilians alive but were instead murdered by being shot in their heads.

KNPLF has also received weapons from the powerful United Wa State Army (UWSA) post-military coup and allegedly been involved in resistance efforts against the Burmese military despite being reformed as a Border Guard Force. Chit Tun, a high ranking member of KNPLF was appointed as one of the two Deputy Ministers of Federal Union Affairs in the National Unity Government(NUG), a parallel government formed by elected lawmakers and members of parliament ousted in the coup d'état. KNPLF announced its support for NUG and some low ranking KNPLF members fought alongside Karenni Nationalities Defence Force against the Burmese military.

References 

Rebel groups in Myanmar
Paramilitary organisations based in Myanmar